Buharkent is a town and a district of Aydın Province in the Aegean region of Turkey, 86 km east of the city of Aydın, on the road and the railway line to Denizli.

The area is in the valley of the Büyük Menderes River with mountains to the north including the 1724m Karlıkdede. The district is known for its hot springs and geothermal energy, indeed Turkey's first geothermal power station was built here in 1984. However the local economy depends on agriculture especially cotton, figs and grapes.

The name Buharkent means steam city and was given in recognition of the power station, it was previously called Burhaniye.

Buharkent itself is a small town of 6,811 people.

References

External links 
 the municipality 
 BUHARKENT

Populated places in Aydın Province
Districts of Aydın Province
Buharkent District